Non-Stop je te plie en deux is the first album of Montreal group We Are Wolves. It was released in 2005.

Track listing 
 "Little Birds" - 3:14
 "L.L. Romeo" - 4:03
 "La Nature" - 5:43
 "Snare Me" - 3:24
 "Namaï - Taïla - Cambodge (Go - Tabla - Go)" - 5:37
 "Non Stop" - 3:02 
 "Moi, Rythme Magique" - 0:23
 "Vosotros, Monstruos" - 2:52
 "T.R.O.U.B.L.E." - 3:57
 "We Are All Winners" - 2:57
 "Glazé, Blazé (Glaze The Blazed)" - 1:26

2005 albums
We Are Wolves albums